Pandwalan Khurd is a Yadav village in New Delhi, India. The pin code of Pandwalan Khurd is 110043.

See also
 Najafgarh

References

Villages in South West Delhi district